2gether 4ever Concert Live is the fourth live album by the Taiwanese Mandopop girl group S.H.E. It was released on August 8, 2014. The live album recorded the Taipei stop of their "2gether 4ever World Tour". It also includes a bonus DVD of behind the scenes.

The live album received "Top 10 Selling Mandarin Albums of the Year" in the IFPI Hong Kong Album Sales Awards 2014.

Track listing
The concert had each member perform two solos, and Selina, Hebe and Ella sang the title songs in their solo albums. They also sang new songs in their new album Blossomy at this concert.

Song List
 Opening
 "SHERO"
 "Can Not Wait" (迫不及待)
 "Satisfaction" (痛快)
 "Faraway" (遠方)
 "Repair Me" (還我)
 "Belief"
 VCR:Ella
 "Shameless" (厚臉皮)
 "Bad Girl" (壞女孩)
 VCR: Hebe
 "LOVE !"
 "Leave Me Alone" (寂寞寂寞就好)
 VCR: Selina
 "Dream" (夢)
 "Everyone Who Loves Me" (愛我的每個人)
 "Flowers Have Blossomed" (花都開好了)
 "Warm Heart" (心還是熱的)
 "The Innocent Women" (像女孩的女人)
 VCR: "Memories of countercurrent" (回憶逆流)
 "Don't Wanna Grow Up" (不想長大)
 "Remember"
 "Chinese" (中國話)
 "Persian Cat"+"I Love Rainy Night Flower"+"London Bridge Is Falling Down"+"Miss Universe" (波斯貓+我愛雨夜花+倫敦大橋垮下來+宇宙小姐)
 "A Brand New Me" (明天的自己)
 "Tropical Rainforest" (熱帶雨林)
 "The Smile of Summer" (夏天的微笑)
 "Wife" (老婆)
 "Dear Tree Hole" (親愛的樹洞)
 "Grey Sky" (天灰)
 VCR: "The Journey We Started Together" (一起開始的旅程)
 "Mayday" (五月天)
 "Where's Love" (愛呢)
 "When the Angels Sing"+"Message of Happiness"+"Magic" (天使在唱歌+幸福留言+魔力)
 "Daybreak" (天亮了)
 "Super Star"
 "I Love You" (我愛你)
 VCR: "Because of you" (因為有你們)
 "Blossomy" (花又開好了)
 "Not Yet Lovers" (戀人未滿)
 "Genesis" (美麗新世界)
 "Never Say Goodbye" (不說再見)
 Bonus Track:"Scarf" (圍巾)
 2gether 4ever behind the scenes

References

S.H.E albums
HIM International Music albums
2014 video albums